The Isaac River is a river and anabranch located in Central Queensland, Australia.

Course 
The headwaters of the river rise south east of Glenden, Queensland and flow in a generally southern direction, crossing the Peak Downs Highway near Moranbah. It continues past Iffley and veers eastward at Leichhardt Downs forming a series of braided channels, and veers south east again and flows past the eastern edge of Junee State Forest and then discharges into the MacKenzie River of which it is a tributary.

History 
Yetimarala (also known as Jetimarala, Yetimaralla, and Bayali) is an Australian Aboriginal language of Central Queensland. Its traditional language region is within the local government areas of Central Highlands Region, on the Boomer Range and Broadsound Range and the Fitzroy River, Killarney Station, Mackenzie River and Isaac River.

The river was named for the pastoralist Frederick Nevil Isaac by the explorer Ludwig Leichhardt who came across the river during his 1845 expedition through the area to Port Essington (now Darwin). Isaac owned Gowrie Station on the Darling Downs and was a keen supporter of Leichhardt.

See also

References

Rivers of Queensland
Central Queensland